Phanerodon is a genus of surfperches native to the eastern Pacific Ocean.

Species
There are currently three recognized species in this genus:
 Phanerodon atripes (D. S. Jordan & C. H. Gilbert, 1880) - sharpnose surfperch
 Phanerodon furcatus Girard, 1854 - white surfperch
 Phanerodon vacca (Girard, 1855) - pile perch

References

Embiotocidae
Marine fish genera
Taxa named by Charles Frédéric Girard